Ratnadvipia karui is a species of air-breathing land snail, a terrestrial pulmonate gastropod mollusk in the family Ariophantidae. It is endemic to island of Sri Lanka.

Etymology
The specific name karui was for the honor for G.P.B. Karunaratne (1931–1996), who was a renowned Sri Lankan naturalist.

Description
Shell is glossy and polished, partly membranaceous, and oval elongately. Mantle found as a broad band around shell and covers all or nearly all of the shell. Shell golden yellow to deep golden-brown in color. Juveniles highly variable in color ranges from dark steel grey, pale bluish or yellowish grey, or greyish white.

Ecology
It can be found in dry zone and lower wet zonal forests and home gardens. When disturbed or touches, it produces a clear, brilliant orange-red mucous.

References

External links
Photos of Ratnadvipia irradians

Ariophantidae
Gastropods described in 1854